The 2018 KBS Song Festival was the 9th edition of KBS Song Festival, held on December 28, 2018, broadcast live from KBS Hall by the Korean Broadcasting System.

This year's theme was "a huge fantastical party".

Broadcast 
On December 11, 2018, KBS announced that the festival would take place on December 28, 2018, at 8:30 p.m. KST, also revealing the first lineup of artists as: BTS, Wanna One, Red Velvet, SEVENTEEN, GFRIEND, BTOB, Apink, Hwang Chi Yeol, Sunmi, Chungha, Norazo, Oh My Girl, and (G)I-DLE. This year's theme is "a huge fantastical party" and expects to meet the 200% of the public's fantasies in a unique stage never seen before

On December 13, a second lineup of artists was revealed: EXO, Twice, AOA, VIXX, NU’EST W, GOT7, MONSTA X, NCT, Highlight’s Yong Jun Hyung, 10 cm, Roy Kim, Lovelyz, and MOMOLAND. It was also revealed that this year's MCs will be EXO’s Chanyeol, Twice’s Dahyun, and BTS’s Jin.

On December 20, the third and final lineup was revealed: WJSN (Cosmic Girls), Kim Yeon Ja, and Celeb Five. It was revealed that JYP and SM would create special stages.

Performers

References

Annual television shows
KBS Song Festival